Al-Omran Club  is a Saudi Arabian football team in Al-Ahsa City playing at the Saudi Third Division.

The club was formerly Al-Sawab Club and its name was changed to Al-Omran Club.

Current squad

References

Omran
1964 establishments in Saudi Arabia
Association football clubs established in 1964
Football clubs in Al-Ahsa Governorate